
Year 835 (DCCCXXXV) was a common year starting on Friday (link will display the full calendar) of the Julian Calendar.

Events 
 By place 
 Europe 
 Ragnar Lodbrok, a Norse Viking ruler, rises to power. He becomes the scourge of France and England (approximate date).
 Viking raids in Ireland on the Kingdom of Munster at Inish Cathaigh

 Britain 
 Danish Viking raiders ally with the Cornish, against the rule of King Egbert of Wessex (approximate date).
 The Isle of Sheppey (off the northern coast of Kent) is attacked by Vikings.

 China 
 December 14 – Sweet Dew Incident: Emperor Wen Zong plots to free the court from the influence of his palace eunuchs. In the northeast sector of the capital Chang'an, after the failure of the emperor's chancellor Li Zhongyan to subdue the eunuchs' influence, troops under the eunuchs' command slaughter many officials and other associates.

 By topic 
 Religion 
 November 1 – Pope Gregory IV promotes the celebration of the feast of All Saints, throughout the Frankish Empire.

Births 
 Ahmad ibn Tulun, Muslim governor (d. 884)
 Ahmad ibn Yusuf, Muslim mathematician (d. 912)
 Guaifer of Salerno, Lombard prince (approximate date)
 Lothair II, king of Lotharingia (d. 869)
 Louis the Younger, king of East Francia (or 830)
 Qian Kuan, Chinese warlord (approximate date)

Deaths 
 Berengar the Wise, Frankish nobleman
 Duan Wenchang, chancellor of the Tang Dynasty (b. 773)
 Jia Su, chancellor of the Tang Dynasty
 Jayavarman II, founder of the Khmer Empire 
 John IV (the Peacemaker), bishop of Naples
 Kūkai, Japanese Buddhist monk (b. 774)
 Li Cou, prince of the Tang Dynasty
 Li Fengji, chancellor of the Tang Dynasty (b. 758)
 Li Zhongyan, chancellor of the Tang Dynasty
 Lu Sui, chancellor of the Tang Dynasty (b. 776)
 Lu Tong, Chinese poet (b. 790)
 Muhammad al-Jawad, 9th Twelver Shī'ah Imām (b. 811)
 Sabrisho II, patriarch of the Church of the East
 Song Ruoxian, Chinese scholar, lady-in-waiting and poet (b. 772)
 Shu Yuanyu, Chinese official and chancellor
 Vladislav, duke of Croatia (approximate date)
 Wang Shoucheng, Chinese eunuch and official
 Wang Ya, chancellor of the Tang Dynasty
 Yang Zhicheng, Chinese governor (jiedushi)
 Zheng Zhu, Chinese general and official

References